Longipediidae is a family of copepods belonging to the order Polyarthra. It contains a single genus.

Genera:

 Longipedia Claus, 1863

References

Copepods
Crustacean families